Ptarmigan was a sternwheel steamboat that operated in British Columbia on the Columbia River from 1903 to 1909.

Design and Construction

Ptarmigan was built at Golden, BC and was the last vessel built for the Upper Columbia Navig. & Tramway Co., of which Capt. Frank P. Armstrong was the principal owner and manager.  Ptarmigans engines were over 60 years old, and had been originally built for a ferry crossing the St. Lawrence River.  The engines had been previously installed in two other sternwheelers on the upper Columbia River, specifically the first Duchess, and the second Duchess.  The blunt-ended bow of Ptarmigan allowed the vessel to be more capable of pushing barges, which increased the vessel's utility and effective cargo capacity.Downs, Art, Paddlewheels on the Frontier -- The Story of British Columbia and Yukon Sternwheel Steamers, at 101-112, Superior Publishing, Seattle WA 1972

Operations
Ptarmigan was placed on the Columbia River route that began at Golden and ran south, at least during high water, to Columbia Lake, the ultimate source of the Columbia River.  In 1903, soon after completion, Ptarmigan was sold to the Columbia River Lumber Company, which hired Armstrong to manage its steamboat operations.  In 1907 Ptarmigan hit a snag  and sank  (A snag is a sunken log jammed in the river bottom but sticking up through the water to just below the surface).  Captain Armstrong was able to raise Ptarmigan  and return her to service.  However Ptarmigan caught fire later in 1907, and her upper works were destroyed.  Again, Ptarmigan was salvaged, her upper works were rebuilt and she was returned to service.

Race with launch Gian

The gasoline engine was a new development in the early 1900s.  Captain Northcote Cantlie, who has gone down in history as "an eccentric Scot"  purchased a gasoline-engined launch, Gian, and placed her on the upper Columbia.  Unlike Armstrong, Cantlie came from a wealthy background, drank champagne for breakfast, and kept a bagpiper as his personal attendant.

Cantlie, knowing that Gian was at least theoretically faster than Ptarmigan made several challenges to Armstrong to race.  There is a story that one day in late August 1906 Cantlie was out in his launch in the river at the same time as Ptarmigan.  Cantle seized the moment and sped past Ptarmigan with his bagpiper blasting out airs as Gian sped past.  This was too much for Captain Armstrong, a master steamboat man and veteran of the Klondike Gold Rush.  Armstrong ordered full steam ahead, and when Ptarmigan caught up to Gian, two or three roustabouts reached over to Gian, seized the still-playing piper, and lifted him unharmed over to the foredeck of Ptarmigan while the piper reportedly never missed a note.  Ptarmigan passed Gian and thereafter Cantlie steered clear of the big steamer.<ref name = McCurdy>McCurdy, H.W., ed., H.W. McCurdy Marine History of the Pacific Northwest, at 88-89, Superior Publishing, Seattle, WA 1966</ref>

DismantledPtarmigan was dismantled in 1909.  Ptarmigans engines, which had been under water at least twice when the vessels they powered sank (once with Ptarmigan, once with the first Duchess) were installed in another vessel, the Nowitka.

Notes

Further reading

 Faber, Jim, Steamer's Wake—Voyaging down the old marine highways of Puget Sound, British Columbia, and the Columbia River, Enetai Press, Seattle, WA 1985 
 Timmen, Fritz, Blow for the Landing'', 75-78, 134, Caxton Printers, Caldwell, ID 1972 

Paddle steamers of British Columbia
Steamboats of the Columbia River
Columbia Valley
1903 ships